This Chapter and Colony Roll of the Honor Society of Agriculture, Gamma Sigma Delta, a co-ed honor society for agriculture students and those in the related sciences, is complete through 2012. Inactive chapters are shown in italics.

List of chapters
These first six chapters began as Delta Theta Sigma chapters.  Where several of these six had closed, at refounding, they have been installed subsequently as a Gamma Sigma Delta chapter with a later chartering date.

The following chapters were installed as Gamma Sigma Delta chapters.

The creation of chapters continued after the 2012 History was written, with the 2014 establishment of a chapter at Massachusetts according to the fraternity's website. Information about one early chapters was not available at the time this page was created, namely, that there was no specific date for the induction of the Auburn chapter.

References
Chapter list provided in the Gamma Sigma Delta History, and on the fraternity's website.

External links
Gamma Sigma Delta national website

Lists of chapters of United States student societies by society